The 2012 Louisiana–Lafayette Ragin' Cajuns softball team represented the University of Louisiana at Lafayette in the 2012 NCAA Division I softball season. The Ragin' Cajuns played their home games at Lamson Park and were led by twelfth and thirteen year husband and wife head coach due Michael and Stefni Lotief, respectively.  This would also be the final season that the Cajuns would have two head coaches as after the season, Stefni Lotief decided to resign to focus on family and personal matters.

Preseason

Sun Belt Conference Coaches Poll
The Sun Belt Conference Coaches Poll was released on February 3, 2012. Louisiana-Lafayette was picked to finish first in the Sun Belt Conference with 80 votes and 8 first place votes

Preseason All-Sun Belt team
Taylor Fawbush (FAU, JR, Pitcher)
Hannah Campbell (USA, SO, Pitcher)
Karavin Drew (WKU, JR, Catcher)
Hayden Gann (TROY, SR, 1st Base)
Lisa Johnson (UNT, SR, 2nd Base)
Nerissa Myers (ULL, JR, Shortstop)
Nikki Hollett (TROY, SR, 3rd Base)
Ashley McClain (FIU, SR, Outfield)
Katie Smith (ULL, SR, Outfield)
Brittany Fowler (USA, JR, Outfield)
Christi Orgeron (ULL, SR, Utility

Sun Belt Preseason Player of the Year
Christi Orgeron (ULL

Roster

Coaching staff

Schedule and results

Lafayette Regional

Tempe Super Regional

References

Louisiana
Louisiana Ragin' Cajuns softball seasons
Louisiana softball